Ferns are plants of the class Polypodiopsida.

Ferns may also refer to:

 Ferns, County Wexford, Ireland, a small historic town
 Roman Catholic Diocese of Ferns
 Alex Ferns (born 1968), Scottish actor and media personality
 Lyndon Ferns (born 1983), South African retired swimmer, former world record holder
 Rube Ferns (1873–1952), American boxer, world welterweight champion

See also
 Bishop of Ferns and Leighlin (Church of Ireland)
 Bishop of Ossory, Ferns and Leighlin (Church of Ireland)
 Ferns Inquiry, an Irish government inquiry into allegations of clerical sexual abuse in the Irish Catholic Diocese of Ferns
 Fern (disambiguation)